Glen Fork is a census-designated place (CDP) in Wyoming County, West Virginia, United States. As of the 2010 census, its population was 487.  The confluence of the Laurel Fork and its tributary, the Glen Fork, is located in the community.

References

Census-designated places in West Virginia
Census-designated places in Wyoming County, West Virginia